Junko Onishi Trio Live in Europe: Play, Piano, Play is an album by Japanese pianist Junko Onishi, released on November 7, 1996 in Japan.

Track listing

Personnel
Junko Onishi - Piano
Shigeo Aramaki - Bass
Dairiki Hara - Drums

Production
Executive Producer - Hitoshi Namekata
Co-Producer - Junko Onishi
Recording Engineer - 1: Johannes Steuer, Manfred Deppe, 2-4: Jaakko James, Andy Snellaman, 5-7: Many Guiot
Mixing Engineer - Shunichi Kogai
Mastering engineer - Yoshio Okazuki
Cover and Inner Photograph - Edouard Curchod
Art director - Kaoru Taku
A&R - Yoshiko Tsuge

References

External links

Junko Onishi HP

PORI JAZZ 1996 Junko Onishi Trio data
MontreuxJazzLive.com Junko Onishi set list

Junko Onishi albums
1996 live albums
Albums recorded at the Montreux Jazz Festival